Magoon is a surname of Scottish origin, derived from the Scottish Gaelic name Mac Ghobhainn, which means "son of the smith". Notable people with the surname include:

 Charles Edward Magoon (1861–1920), American lawyer, judge, diplomat, and administrator
 Seymour Magoon (1908–?), American hitman in New York's Murder Inc. gang
 George Magoon (1875–1943), American baseball player
 Henry S. Magoon (1832–1889) American politician

See also
 Meet the Magoons, six part comedy television series in the United Kingdom aired on Channel 4 in 2005
McGowan

References